Edward Burger Burger (born December 10, 1964) is a mathematician and President Emeritus of Southwestern University in Georgetown, Texas. Previously, he was the Francis Christopher Oakley Third Century Professor of Mathematics at Williams College, and the Robert Foster Cherry Professor for Great Teaching at Baylor University. He also had been named to a single-year-appointment as vice provost of strategic educational initiatives at Baylor University in February 2011. He currently serves as the president and CEO of St. David's Foundation.

Burger has been honored as a leader in education. He has been a keynote speaker, invited special session speaker, or the conference chair at a number of American Mathematical Society, Mathematical Association of America, and the National Council of Teachers of Mathematics conferences.

During the late 1980s Burger was featured at a stand-up comedy club in Austin, Texas and also was an 'independent contractor', writing for Jay Leno. Today he has a weekly program on higher education, thinking, and learning produced by NPR's Austin affiliate KUT called Higher ED.

Education
Graduated from Connecticut College in 1985, where he had earned B.A. summa cum laude with distinction in mathematics, in 1990, he was awarded his Ph.D. in mathematics from The University of Texas at Austin. He did his postdoctoral work at the University of Waterloo in Canada. In 2013 he was awarded an LL.D. from Williams College.

Career

Research
His research interests include algebraic number theory, Diophantine analysis, p-adic analysis, geometry of numbers, and the theory of continued fractions. He teaches abstract algebra, "The Art of Creating Mathematics", and Diophantine analysis.

Teaching
He has taught or has been a visiting scholar at The University of Texas at Austin, Westminster College, James Madison University, the University of Colorado at Boulder, Concordia University Texas, Baylor University, and the Macquarie University in Australia.

Burger is a pioneer in rich, multimedia Internet lectures that, together with written material, form an electronic textbook. Together with Thinkwell, Burger "crafted the first-ever virtual, CD-ROM video, interactive, mathematics texts/courses" published over the World Wide Web. Additionally, his lesson tutorial videos earned publisher Holt, Rinehart and Winston one of the 2007 Awards of Excellence from Technology & Learning, an academic publication.

Burger has written and starred in number of educational videos, including the 24-lecture video series Zero to Infinity: A History of Numbers and An Introduction to Number Theory. He has delivered more than 400 lectures worldwide and has appeared on more than 40 radio and TV programs including ABC News Now on WABC-TV in New York and National Public Radio. He starred in the "Mathletes" episode of NBC's "Science of the Winter Olympics" series shown on the Today Show and throughout the 2010 Winter Olympic Games.

In recognition for his work in multimedia education technology, The Association of Educational Publishers awarded Burger with the 2007 Distinguished Achievement Award for Educational Video Technology.

Burger feels that "math trauma" is commonly inflicted upon America's elementary and middle-school students, particularly girls, having received a seventh-grade report card stating: "Eddie is a nice boy, but he'll never do well in math." He offers hisnts "challenging questions for which the solution is by no means apparent". He proceeded to demonstrate the solution to that challenge, wearing huge Boston Red Sox boxer shorts under his trousers, at the Boston Public Library in the summer of 2005.

In addition to his math courses, Burger teaches a short course in comedy writing during the winter study program at Williams. Combining math with comedy comes from his days as a stand-up comic at the Laff Stop Comedy Club in Austin in the late-1980s.

Publications 
Burger has written 12 books and has had more than 30 papers published in scholarly journals. With Michael Starbird, he coauthored The Heart of Mathematics: An invitation to effective thinking, for which they won a 2001 Robert W. Hamilton Book Award, and Coincidences, Chaos, and All That Math Jazz,, a humorous look at mathematics filed under both math and humor in the Library of Congress catalog. Burger is also an associate editor for the American Mathematical Monthly and a member of the editorial board for [AK Peters Publishing].

Some of the books and papers he has authored or co-authored include:
 , 1993
 "Pleasures vs. Problems", February 2000
 Exploring the Number Jungle: A Journey into Diophantine Analysis (Student Mathematical Library, V. 8), July 2000
 "'Math Forum'—I couldn't keep my distance: A mathematical seduction, February 2002
 The Joy of Thinking: The Beauty and Power of Classical Mathematical Ideas: Part 1 & 2 (The Great Courses – Science & Mathematics), 
 Making Transcendence Transparent: An intuitive approach to classical transcendental number theory, July 2004
 Coincidences, Chaos, and All That Math Jazz: Making Light of Weighty Ideas, August 2005
 Matematicas, 2007
 Mathematics: Course 2, Holt, January 2007
 Algebra 1, Holt, January 2007
 Extending the Frontiers of Mathematics: Inquiries into proof and argumentation, March 2007
 Algebra 2, Holt, August 2007
 The 5 Elements of Effective Thinking, (with Michael Starbird) published by Princeton University Press in September 2012, 

Additionally, Burger has created virtual video textbooks on CD-ROM and on the web for Thinkwell on the topics of "College Algebra", 2000; "Pre-Calculus", 2000; "Calculus", 2001; "Intermediate Algebra", 2001; "Beginning Algebra", 2004; "Trigonometry", 2006; "Prealgebra", 2007; and "Algebra II", 2011.

Professional positions 
Burger has held the following professional positions:
 University of Texas at Austin
 Visiting lecturer, Summer 1990; Visiting Assistant Professor, Fall 1994; Visiting Scholar, Summer 1997
 University of Waterloo, Canada
 Postdoctoral fellow, 1990–1991
 Williams College
 Assistant professor, 1990–1996; associate professor, 1997–2000; professor of mathematics, 2001–2013; chair of the Department of Mathematics and Statistics, 2003–2006; Gaudino Scholar, 2008–2010; Lissack Professor for Social Responsibility and Personal Ethics, 2010–2012; Francis Christopher Oakley Third Century Professor of Mathematics, 2012–2013
 James Madison University; Macquarie University, Australia
 Visiting fellow, summer 1999
 Westminster College
 Genevieve W. Gore Distinguished Resident, March 2001
 Mass Interaction
 Mathematics consultant, summer 2001
 Texas Christian University
 Cecil and Ida Green Honors Professor, fall 2001
 American Mathematical Monthly
 Associate editor, 2002–present
 The Educational Advancement Foundation
 Member of the board of trustees, 2004–2008
 AK Peters Publishing
 Member of the editorial board, 2005–present
 NUMB3RS in the Classroom Project, CBS-TV/Paramount Studios/Texas Instruments
 Mathematics advisor, 2005–2007
The Thomas S. Kenan Institute for the Arts at the University of North Carolina School of the Arts
Member of the board, 2009–present
Baylor University
Robert Foster Cherry Professor for Great Teaching, 2010–2012
Vice provost for strategic educational initiatives, 2011–2012
Southwestern University
15th president, 2013–2020
St. David's Foundation
President and CEO

Selected honors and awards 
Some of the honors and awards Burger has received include:
 2014 Elected to The Philosophical Society of Texas.
2013 Awarded an Honorary Degree (Doctor of Laws) from Williams College.
 2013 Fellow of the American Mathematical Society.
 2012 "Global Hero in Education", Named by Microsoft Corporation
 2010 Telly Award, for the "Mathletes" episode of the NBC-Universal television series "The Science of the Olympic Winter Games" (the entire series won a 2011 Emmy Award) 
 2010 Game Changer, Named by The Huffington Post; "HuffPost's Game Changers salutes 100 innovators, visionaries, mavericks, and leaders who are reshaping their fields and changing the world."
 2010 Robert Foster Cherry Award for Great Teaching from Baylor University
 2007 Award of Excellence, for "educational mathematics videos that break new ground", Technology & Learning magazine
 2007 Distinguished Achievement Award, for Educational Video Technology, The Association of Educational Publishers
 2006 "100 Best of America", Listed in Reader's Digest Annual Special Issue as Best Math Teacher
 2006 Lester R. Ford Award for the expository article A Tail of Two Palindromes
 2003 Residence Life Academic Teaching Award, University of Colorado at Boulder
 2001 Robert W. Hamilton Book Award, for "The Heart of Mathematics"
 1988 Mathematics Teaching Award, The University of Texas at Austin

Burger is the Francis Christopher Oakley Third Century Professor of Mathematics and was the Lissack Professor for Social Responsibility and Personal Ethics (2010–2012)  and the Gaudino Scholar (2008–2010) at Williams College, where he was also awarded the 2007 Nelson Bushnell Prize for Scholarship and Teaching.

Burger has been honored by The Mathematical Association of America on several occasions: 2001, Deborah and Franklin Haimo Awards for Distinguished College or University Teaching of Mathematics; 2001–2003, George Pólya lecturer; 2004, Chauvenet Prize; and 2006, Lester R. Ford Award

See also
 List of University of Waterloo people

References

External links 
 

1964 births
Living people
20th-century American mathematicians
21st-century American mathematicians
Connecticut College alumni
University of Texas at Austin College of Natural Sciences alumni
Williams College faculty
Fellows of the American Mathematical Society
People from Georgetown, Texas